Bangladesh has competed in every Olympic Games since 1984, with Bangladesh competing as part of India prior to 1947 and Pakistan prior to 1972. The nation never won a medal in the Summer Olympics and has never competed in the Winter Olympic Games.

In 2016, Siddikur Rahman became the first Bangladeshi to qualify for the Olympic games in golf, and Bangladesh sent seven athletes to compete, more than any other year. The country has sent other representatives to the Games thanks to the wildcard process. Bangladesh, with an approximate population of 170 million, is the most populous country in the world never to have won an Olympic medal.

Bangladesh Olympic Association head Wali Ullah has stated that Bangladesh's weak economy accounts for its poor results in sports.

Medal tables

Medals by Summer Games

See also 
 List of flag bearers for Bangladesh at the Olympics
 Bangladesh at the Paralympics

References

External links
 
 
 

 
Olympics